Little Teddy Recordings is an Austro-German independent record label based in Munich, Bavaria,  established in 1990 by Andreas Freiberger and Armin Kasperas as a platform for their band The Bartlebees. The label has gone on to release recordings, including debuts, from many artists including  Pete and the Pirates, Television Personalities, Sleaford Mods, Stereo Total, Tullycraft, The Mad Scene, Crystal Stilts, The Wave Pictures, The Bats, The Silly Pillows, and The Cannanes.

List of Artists (selection) 

 The Bats
 The Cannanes
 Crystal Stilts
 Daniel Johnston
 The Go-Betweens
 Koufax
 The Legends
 The Mad Scene
 M.O.T.O.
 Pete and the Pirates
 The Silly Pillows
 Sleaford Mods
 Stereo Total
 Television Personalities
 The Wave Pictures
 Tullycraft

References

External links
 

German independent record labels
Record labels established in 1990
Companies based in Munich